Carl Frederick Mengeling S.T.D (born October 22, 1930) is an American prelate of the Roman Catholic Church. He served as bishop of the Diocese of Lansing in Michigan from 1996 to 2008.

Biography
Mengeling was born on October 22, 1930, in Hammond, Indiana, to Carl H. and Augusta Huke Mengeling.  Raised in a Lutheran family, Mengeling converted to Catholicism at age nine. He attended St. Mary Elementary School in Griffith, Indiana, and graduated from Griffith High School in 1948.  Mengeling then entered St. Meinrad College and Seminary in Saint Meinrad, Indiana.

Priesthood 
On May 25, 1957, Mengeling was ordained to the priesthood for the new Diocese of Gary by Bishop Andrew Grutka at the Cathedral of the Holy Angels in Gary, Indiana. After his ordination, Mengeling became associate pastor of St. Mark's Parish in Gary. In 1961, Mengeling entered the Pontifical University of St. Thomas Aquinas in Rome, obtaining his Licentiate of Sacred Theology.  He also attended the Alphonsian Academy in Rome, earning a Doctor of Sacred Theology degree. Mengeling acted as a page during some sessions of the Second Vatican Council.

After returning to Indiana in 1964, Mengeling began teaching at Bishop Noll High School in Hammond, Indiana, St. Joseph Calumet College in East Chicago, Indiana, and St. Procopius Seminary in Lisle, Illinois. In 1968, Mengeling became pastor of All Saints Parish in Hammond, Indiana, then in 1970 was transferred to Holy Name Parish in Cedar Lake, Indiana. In 1971, Mengeling was named pastor of Nativity of Our Savior Parish in Portage, Indiana, serving there until 1985.

Raised by the Vatican to the title of monsignor in June 1984, Mengeling chaired the Diocesan Worship Commission and the Vocations Committee in Gary.  He also founded the diocesan Institute of Religion and chaired it for 14 years. Mengeling also served on the Presbyteral Council, the Ecumenical Commission and the Permanent Diaconate Formation team. In 1985, Mengeling was appointed pastor of St. Thomas More Parish in Munster, Indiana.

Bishop of Lansing 
On November 7, 1995, Pope John Paul II appointed Mengeling as the fourth bishop of the Diocese of Lansing, He received his episcopal consecration on January 25, 1996, from Cardinal Adam Maida, with Bishops Kenneth Povish and Dale Melczek serving as co-consecrators, in St. Mary Cathedral in Lansing, Michigan.  Mengeling selected as his episcopal motto: "He must increase", from John 3:30. During his tenure, Mengeling opened several parochial schools and churches. He also involved himself with the activities of Hispanic, Vietnamese, and African-American Catholics in his diocese.

In 2002, Mengeling removed from ministry Vincent DeLorenzo, a priest in a Flint, Michigan parish.  A young man had accused DeLorenzo of sexually abusing him when he was a minor and DeLorenzo admitted his guilt.  The diocese forwarded the accusation to the Genesee County Michigan district attorney and asked the Vatican to defrock DeLorenzo. In 2003, In response to sexual misconduct scandals among the clergy, Mengeling instituted the Virtus program in 2003 and visited retreats for victims of sexual abuse. Also in 2003, he issued a statement on the war in Iraq, calling for "a swift end to hostilities and commitment to reconciliation..."

Pope Benedict VI accepted Mengeling's retirement as bishop of the Diocese of Lansing on February 27, 2008. He was succeeded by Bishop Earl Boyea.

See also
 

 Catholic Church hierarchy
 Catholic Church in the United States
 Historical list of the Catholic bishops of the United States
 List of Catholic bishops of the United States
 Lists of patriarchs, archbishops, and bishops

References

External links
Diocese of Lansing
Virtus program

Episcopal succession

1930 births
Living people
Converts to Roman Catholicism from Lutheranism
Pontifical University of Saint Thomas Aquinas alumni
Alphonsian Academy alumni
Benedictine University faculty
Saint Meinrad Seminary and School of Theology alumni
People from Hammond, Indiana
Roman Catholic Diocese of Gary
Roman Catholic bishops of Lansing
20th-century Roman Catholic bishops in the United States
21st-century Roman Catholic bishops in the United States
Participants in the Second Vatican Council
People from Munster, Indiana
People from Griffith, Indiana
Religious leaders from Indiana
Catholics from Indiana